Eastern Recherche Marine Park is a marine park  adjacent to the Recherche Archipelago, close to the Western Australian Cape Arid National Park, and 135 km east of Esperance, on the south coast of Western Australia.

It was proclaimed under the EPBC Act in 2013 and given its present name in 2017.

The park contains  habitats adjacent to the Recherche Archipelago, which contains over 150 islands stretching over 200 km² of ocean, and is an area of high biodiversity. It also contains an extensive area of rocky reef environments, in addition to seagrass habitats. Both the reef and seagrass habitats support many warm temperate species.

The park contains two known shipwrecks listed under the Historic Shipwrecks Act 1997: Rodondo (1894) and the Start (1879).

References

 
Exclusive economic zone of Australia